The 1942 South American Basketball Championship was the 10th edition of this tournament.  It was held in Santiago, Chile and won by the Argentina national basketball team.  It was the first time since the 1935 championship that the host had not won the competition.  5 teams competed despite the World War that was under way.

Final rankings

Results

Preliminary round

Each team played the other four teams once, for a total of four games played by each team and 10 overall in the preliminary round.  

The tie for third place was resolved by head-to-head results, with Chile taking the bronze medal as they beat Brazil.  

As Argentina and Uruguay were tied for first place, a final game to determine the championship was required.

Final

Argentina and Uruguay played a final matchup after each finishing 3-1 in the preliminary round.  Uruguay had won the preliminary meeting between the two, but Argentina proved victorious in the rematch to take the gold medal.

External links

FIBA.com archive for SAC1942

1942
S
B
South American Basketball Championship
Sports competitions in Santiago
Champ
1940s in Santiago, Chile
South American Basketball Championship